Estalkh Kuh (also Romanized as Estalkh Kūh and Esţalkh Kūh; also known as  Estalkūh, Estel Kūh, Istakhlku, and Salākhūn) is a village in Khorgam Rural District, Khorgam District, Rudbar County, Gilan Province, Iran. At the 2006 census, its population was 213, in 70 families.

References 

Populated places in Rudbar County